Lorette is a commune in the Loire department in central France, in the Gier valley.

Geography
Lorette lies in the valley of the Gier, a coal mining region, on the south bank of the Giers just east of La Grand-Croix.
The Dorlay river, a tributary of the Gier that rises in Mont Pilat, defines the west border of the commune.

History
The region was developed in the 19th century for coal mining.
In 1830 the Jackson brothers (Frères Jackson) built a steel works at Assailly in what is now the north of Lorette. As a result of a merger, in 1854 this became part of the Compagnie des Hauts-fourneaux, forges et aciéries de la Marine et des chemins de fer, based in Rive-de-Gier.
Lorette was created on 27 April 1847 in response to the development of the steelworks, particularly that of the Jackson Brothers.
It includes the old quarters of the municipalities of Saint-Paul-en-Jarez, Saint-Genis-Terrenoire (now Genilac), Rive-de-Gier and Farnay.

Churches
Lorette has two places of worship. 
Notre Dame, located in the bottom of the town, was completely renovated a few years ago. It is a very light church, since the stained glass has been  replaced by large windows. Only two stained glass windows remain above the choir. Currently, it is mainly used in large masses and ceremonies. The John XXIII chapel is located on the main street of the town, just down the road. Shaped as a theater, the choir of the chapel is at the bottom of the steps in a pit. It is used every Sunday for mass.

Population

Personalities
 Étienne Rival born 15 November 1855 - Priest
 Alain Prost born 24 February 1955 at the clinique Les Berceaux - 4-time Formula One champion
 Michel Corringe died at Lorette le 2 October 2001 - Singer 
 Jean Delay born at Lorette 19 October 1879 - Bishop of Marseille

See also
Communes of the Loire department

References

Communes of Loire (department)